Daniel Galbraith (February 1, 1813 – December 17, 1879) was a Canadian farmer and political figure in the province of Ontario. He represented Lanark North as a Liberal in the Legislative Assembly of Ontario from 1867 to 1872 and in Lanark North in the House of Commons of Canada from 1872 to 1879.

He was born in Glasgow, Scotland in 1813 and came to Lanark County with his family in 1821. He served as reeve for Ramsay Township and also served as warden for Lanark County. Galbraith was elected to the Ontario legislature in 1867 and reelected in 1871. He resigned his seat in 1872 to run for a seat in the federal parliament.

He was also director of the Brockville and Ottawa Railway. In 1850, he married Janet McFarlane. He died while still in office in 1879.

References

External links

1813 births
1879 deaths
Liberal Party of Canada MPs
Members of the House of Commons of Canada from Ontario
Ontario Liberal Party MPPs
People from Almonte, Ontario
Politicians from Glasgow
Scottish emigrants to pre-Confederation Ontario
Immigrants to Upper Canada